Diane Washburn (born May 10, 1932) is a former fashion model for Rose Marie Reid, Roos Brothers and Lily Ann (among others) as well as appearing in ads for Chevrolet and taking the cover of Life Magazine in 1953. Most notable as California's 1953 National Vintage Queen, Washburn is also the wife of late Broadway actor Jack Washburn.

Early life
Diane was born in San Francisco, California, and grew up in Marin County where she was the daughter of famed Marin County District Attorney A.E. Bagshaw and Audrey Van Tassel. She attended Dominican Convent under the Sisters of San Rafael for her elementary education followed by Marin Junior College where she obtained her degree in Interior Design. She also was a member of the prestigious Ballet School of Marin County.
   
Diane's father, Albert E. Bagshaw was best known for the role he played in the 1935 San Quentin State Prison breakout where "four inmates, convicted killers and kidnappers, headed up to the house of Warden James B. Holohan. There Holohan was savagely beaten and knocked unconscious by one Rudolph Straight for tying to call for help. The warden had been lunching with staff and parole board members, and the convicts with four .45 caliber pistols ordered the members of the board to take off their clothes. Dressed as civilians the men then kidnapped the board and two guards in a big Studebaker, and headed up ten miles past San Rafael. In his book The San Quentin Story, which in 1937 would become a film starring Humphrey Bogart, Clinton T. Duffy, assistant to Warden Holohan and future San Quentin Warden, describes the event. ‘Indeed, every road in a fifty mile radius was soon swarming with police cars, and it seemed inevitable that someone would be killed,’ recants Duffy. One of the criminals, Alexander MacKay, ‘turned sharply off the road, but he couldn’t control the car and it plowed into a ditch.’ The escapees then ‘scrambled for grass cover, and…took refuge inside a barn just as the first of the pursuing posses arrived.’ MacKay and the others ‘dropped their weapons and prepared to surrender, but Straight was beyond all reason. He strutted out of the barn with a gun in each hand, and was shot through the head by District Attorney Albert Bagshaw of San Rafael.'"--The San Quentin Story, Clinton T. Duffy, San Quentin State Prison, Warden.

Career
In California in 1950 a tradition was started to promote the state's wine region, electing an annual "Vintage Queen." Diane was informed by a close friend that interviews were being held at the Civic Auditorium in San Francisco for the esteemed post as the ambassador of California wine. Mrs. Washburn says simply of the process, "I sat down in the interview and after a few questions I had the job." In her biography, A Celebration of Life, it reveals that "the exhausting schedule had Miss Bagshaw on tour in Los Angeles, New York, the Napa Valley and Central Coast, at galas and dinners, parades, and luncheons."
Previous to "Vintage Queen," Mrs. Washburn was a member of the John Robert Powers agency in New York in 1948, and also trained at the Dorothy Farrier School of Modeling. She was "the bathing suit girl" for several years with Rose Marie Reid, modeled for clothing designer Adolph Schumann and Roos Brothers, as well as numerous local ads and promos throughout California's wine region.

Personal life
      
In 1953, Diane met Jack Washburn at Hermy King's Rumpus Room, where he was performing with entertainer Johnny Desmond. Jack Washburn had begun his career performing in night clubs in San Francisco and traveled with actor and comedian Bob Hope to entertain the troops during World War 2. Mr. Washburn is best known for his roles as Marius in Josh Logan's 'Fanny' on Broadway, where he replaced Bill Tabbert as the lead after Tabbert became ill, and the 1954 film The Black Orchid starring Sophia Loren and Anthony Quinn.
          
Diane also appeared on the popular television series Arthur Godfrey Talent Scouts, where she introduced her husband onto stage to sing 'Rags to Riches.' Mr. Washburn received "wild applause" and won the show. She also played the 'Stranger in Paradise' for Perry Como on his long running nighttime show.

In 1964 Mrs. Washburn had the privilege of dancing with President John F. Kennedy at the British Embassy in Washington after his attendance at the National Theater for a performance of 'Mr. President.' Diane’s husband Jack was in the show that evening playing Youssen Daver, a role which he created.

 
Diane lives today in New Hope, Pennsylvania at her farm 'Glen Gables,' a c. 1740s carriage house that she and Jack purchased from notable Pennsylvania modernist artist R.A.D. Miller. The house, on the National Historic Register, has hosted "countless film and stage actors including Esther Williams, Ann Miller, Patti Page, Shirley Jones, and Chita Rivera." (pg.33-42, A Celebration of Life, Xlibis, 2007).

References

External links
Wine X Magazine
Diane Washburn
Jack Washburn, Lambertville Music Circus
New York Times, March 1992

1932 births
Living people
Female models from California
People from Marin County, California
People from Bucks County, Pennsylvania
21st-century American women